Henrietta Holsman Fore (born December 9, 1948) is an American public health and international development executive who served as the 7th Executive Director of UNICEF till January 2022. Fore currently serves as Chairman and CEO of Holsman International, a management, investment, and advisory services company. She served in three presidential appointments under President George W. Bush: Fore was the first woman Administrator of the United States Agency for International Development (USAID) and Director of U.S. Foreign Assistance, the 11th Under Secretary of Management in the Department of State, and the 37th Director of the United States Mint in the U.S. Department of Treasury. She was the presidential appointee for President George H. W. Bush at the United States Agency for International Development.

Early life and education 
Fore was born in Chicago, Illinois. Her mother was from Switzerland. Her father served the military during World War I. Her grandfather is turn of the century architect Henry K. Holsman, inventor of the Holsman Automobile (1902-1911).

Fore grew up in Santa Barbara, California and attended Crane Country Day School and Cold Springs School. She attended the Graham-Eckes School in Palm Beach, Florida, and graduated in 1966 from The Baldwin School, a private girls boarding school in Bryn Mawr, Pennsylvania.

In 1970, Fore received a B.A. in history, economics, and art from Wellesley College. In 1975, she received a M.S. in public administration from the University of Northern Colorado. In 1986, she studied international politics at the University of Oxford.

Career
After college, Fore worked in the federal government. She then worked at one of her father's companies, a small manufacturing business in the steel industry, a position she held for 12 years. From 1977 to 1989, she was president and director of Stockton Wire Products in Burbank, California. From 1981 to 1989, she was president and the chairman of the board of Pozacorp, Inc. in Burbank, California.

From 2001 to 2005, Fore served as the 37th Director of the United States Mint in the U.S. Department of Treasury, serving Secretary of Treasury, Paul H. O'Neill and Secretary of Treasury John W. Snow.

From 2005 to 2007, Fore served as Under Secretary of State for Management, the Chief Operating Officer for the United States Department of State, serving Secretary of State, Condoleezza Rice.

From May 2007 to January 2009, Fore served as the 13th Administrator of the U.S. Agency for International Development (USAID), and Director of United States Foreign Assistance, holding the equivalent rank as Deputy Secretary of State.

In January 2018, Fore was appointed as the executive director of UNICEF by the Secretary-General of the United Nations, Antonio Guterres. As part of this position, Fore has worked in collaboration with GAVI, Coalition for Epidemic Preparedness Innovations (CEPI), and the World Health Organization, among others, to facilitate vaccination to combat the COVID-19 global pandemic.

Fore resigned in July 2021 to attend to her husband’s serious health issue but offered to stay on until her successor was recruited. Her successor, Catherine M. Russell, assumed office on February 1, 2022.

Fore is currently the Chairman and CEO of Holsman International; Chairman and Owner of Stockton Products and Vincenza; and Chairman and Managing Partner of Seaward International Company. She also serves as a Mission Board Member of EQT Future Fund; Director of Imperative Care; Board Trustee of Center for Strategic and International Studies (CSIS); and a Board Member of Global Preparedness Monitoring Board, co-convened by the World Bank Group and WHO.

Personal life
Fore lives in Nevada with her husband Richard L. Fore, who has four children. She has one sister, Marta Babson. Fore is a Republican.

Selected honors
 2022:  Emperor of Japan, Imperial Palace Grand Cordon of the Order of the Rising Sun
 2022: American Committees on Foreign Relations Distinguished Service Award for the Advancement of Public Discourse on Foreign Policy
 2020: U.S. Global Leadership Coalition Leadership Award
 2013: CRDF Global’s George Brown Award for International Scientific Cooperation 
 2009: United States Secretary of State, Distinguished Service Award
 2005: U.S. Department of the Treasury, Alexander Hamilton Award 
 1997: State of the World Forum, Women Redefining Leadership Award

Selected leadership and memberships
 2022–present: GWL Voices for Change and Inclusion (New York)
 2022–present: EQT Future Fund, Mission Board Member 
 2022–present: Imperative Care, Director 
 2022–present, 2009-2017: Seaward International Company, Chairman and CEO
 2022–present, 1995-2017: Center for Strategic and International Studies (CSIS), Board Trustee
 2022–present, 1993-2017: Holsman International, Chairman and CEO
 2022–present, 1977-2017: Stockton Products, President and Director
 2020–present: Global Preparedness Monitoring Board, co-convened by the World Bank and WHO 
 2018-2022: UNICEF, Executive Director 
 2018-2022: Chief Executives Board of the United Nations, Secretariat for the U.N. Secretary-General NY
 2018-2022: Global Leadership Council Generation Unlimited, Co-Chair
 2018-2021: End Violence Against Children, Chair
 2016-2017: Essilor International S.A., Executive Officers & Remuneration Committee and Strategic Committee
 2015-2017: Middle East Investment Initiative, Chair of the Board of Directors
 2014-2017: Initiative for Global Development, Director, Chair
 2014-2017: General Mills, Governance Committee and Public Responsibility Committee
 2012-2017: ExxonMobil, Audit Committee and Finance Committee
 2011-2017: Center for Global Development, Director
 2010-2017: Committee for Economic Development, Trustee
 2010-2017: Theravance Biopharma US, Inc., Chair, Nominating and Governance Committee
 2009-2015: WomenCorporateDirectors Foundation (New York), Global Co-chair
 2007-2009: Millennium Challenge Corporation, Board Member
 2007-2009: Overseas Private Investment Corporation, Board Member
 1993-2017: Asia Society, Co-chair, Global Board of Directors
 1993-2017: The Aspen Institute, Board Trustee
 1993-2017: Chief Executives for Corporate Purpose (CECP), Board Member
 1987-1989: Water Quality Management, Board Member
 1987: Stanford Graduate School of Business, Board Governance
 1981-1989: Pozacorp, Inc., Chairman of the Board
 American Academy of Diplomacy, Member
 American Leadership for a WaterSecure World Campaign Cabinet, Member
 Chief Executives Organization, Member
 Committee of 200, Member
 Council on Foreign Relations, Member
 Economic Club of New York, Member
 International Women's Forum, Member
 Wellesley College Business Leadership Council, Member
 YPO/WPO, Member

Selected works and publications

References

External links

 USAID biography
 State Department biography
 

|-

|-

|-

1948 births
Living people
21st-century American women
Administrators of the United States Agency for International Development
Directors of ExxonMobil
Directors of the United States Mint
American women diplomats
American diplomats
George W. Bush administration personnel
The Baldwin School alumni
UNICEF people
United States Department of State officials
University of Northern Colorado alumni
Wellesley College alumni
Grand Cordons of the Order of the Rising Sun